is a retired Japanese women's professional shogi player, ranked 2-dan.

Personal life

Nakakura's sister, Hiromi, is also a women's professional shogi player.

Nakakura is married to professional shogi player Makoto Chūza. The couple married in November 2003, and have three children.

Promotion history

References

External links
 公益社団法人日本女子プロ将棋協会: 所属棋士 

 Nakakura's shogi school and blog website: 株式会社いつつ
 

Japanese shogi players
Living people
Women's professional shogi players
LPSA
Hosei University alumni
Professional shogi players from Tokyo Metropolis
People from Fuchū, Tokyo
Retired women's professional shogi players
1977 births